William Gordon Carter (born December 2, 1937) is a Canadian former professional ice hockey forward who played 16 games in the National Hockey League for the Montreal Canadiens and Boston Bruins between 1957 and 1962. The rest of his career, which lasted from 1956 to 1969, was spent in various minor leagues.

Playing career
A native of Eastern Ontario's easternmost city, Cornwall, Billy Carter started in 1956 at the age of 18, playing for the Ottawa Junior Canadiens.  In his 13-year career, he also played for a number of American teams, including the Omaha Knights in 1964–65 and 1967–68, the Buffalo Bisons in 1965–66, 1966–67 and, alongside his Omaha Knights commitment, in 1967–68. His final season before retirement, 1968–69, was spent with the Denver Spurs.

Career statistics

Regular season and playoffs

References

External links
 

1937 births
Living people
Boston Bruins players
Buffalo Bisons (AHL) players
Canadian expatriate ice hockey players in the United States
Canadian ice hockey forwards
Denver Spurs (WHL) players
Ice hockey people from Ontario
Hull-Ottawa Canadiens players
Memphis Wings players
Montreal Canadiens players
Omaha Knights (CHL) players
Quebec Aces (AHL) players
Rochester Americans players
Seattle Totems (WHL) players
Sportspeople from Cornwall, Ontario